The Pro Basketball League (PBL) Star of the Coaches (Ster van de Coaches in Dutch) was an annual Pro Basketball League award given to the player who got the most votes for being the league's best player from coaches in the league. The award was discontinued in 2018, when it was decided that coaches' votes would contribute to elect the season MVP, and no longer used for a separate award.

Winners

Notes

References

Basketball League Belgium Division I awards